Suleyman Orazov (born 2 January 1989) is a Turkmen footballer playing for FC Aşgabat of the Ýokary Liga as a midfielder. He received his first national team cap against Guam on 11 June 2015.

Club career
From 2015 to 2019, he played for FC Ahal. His current club is FC Aşgabat.

International career
Played for Turkmenistan in the Asian Games 2010.

Orazow made his senior national team debut on 11 June 2015, in an 2018 FIFA World Cup qualification – AFC Second Round match against Guam.

References

External links

Turkmenistan international footballers
Association football midfielders
Living people
Turkmenistan footballers
1989 births
FC Ahal players
Footballers at the 2010 Asian Games
Asian Games competitors for Turkmenistan